The enzyme (R)-limonene synthase (EC 4.2.3.20) catalyzes the reversible chemical reaction

geranyl diphosphate  (+)-(4R)-limonene + diphosphate

This enzyme belongs to the family of lyases, specifically those carbon-oxygen lyases acting on phosphates.  The systematic name of this enzyme class is geranyl-diphosphate diphosphate-lyase [cyclizing, (+)-(4R)-limonene-forming]. Other names in common use include (+)-limonene synthase, and geranyldiphosphate diphosphate lyase [(+)-(R)-limonene-forming].  This enzyme participates in monoterpenoid biosynthesis and is localized to Leucoplasts of oil gland secretory cells.

References

Further reading 

 
 
 

EC 4.2.3
Enzymes of unknown structure